Ken Chu is a Taiwanese singer, composer, actor, cook; and a member of Taiwanese Mandopop vocal quartet boy band F4. Educated in Singapore (Boon Lay Secondary School), he speaks Mandarin, Cantonese and English.

Biography
Chu was working as a waiter in Taiwan when he was discovered by Cai Zhiping, the creator of the boy band F4. He started in showbiz working as a part-time as an assistant for some artists, then acting in several idol series successfully which pushed him to the center of the stage. He starred in the TV series, Meteor Garden, its supplementary mini-series, Meteor Rain, and its sequel, Meteor Garden II. He was the lead in Sky of Love (2003) and Tokyo Trial (2006).

In January 2005, he released his debut solo album, On Ken's Time. The tracks "永不停止" (Never Stopping) and "La La La" were nominated for Top 10 Gold Songs at the Hong Kong TVB8 Awards, presented by television station TVB8, in 2005.

He also released a cookbook, Mei Wei Guan Xi (Delicious Relations) on January 5, 2006. It was released in China on July 4, 2006, and four months later in Japan. Chu is now focusing on his solo acting career and has a huge fan base in Asia.

On February 24 and 25, 2007, he held his first solo concert in Japan, titled 2007 [I-KEN] 1st Concert at the Tokyo International Forum Hall A with an unplugged theme. December 2007, Chu starred alongside Iza Calzado in Philippine production movie Batanes: Sa Dulo ng Walang Hanggan of Ignite Media Films, directed by Adolf Alix.

Filmography

Film

Television series

Discography

Studio albums (solo)

Soundtrack
 2003 – Love Storm – "Inside of My Guitar"

F4 albums

Books
Mei Wei Guan Xi (Delicious Relations) – cookbook
With F4
F4@Tokyo – 2005 photobook
Comic Man – The First Anniversary of F4 – 2002 photobook
Meteor in Barcelona  – 2002 photobook
F4 Music Party – 2001 photobook

Endorsements
Qingdao Beer (2002, Taiwan)
Acer Mobile Phones (2000, Taiwan)
With F4
Pepsi – 2002~2005 Taiwan, Hong Kong, China
YAMAHA – 2003 South East Asia
S&K – 2002–2006 Taiwan, Hong Kong, China
Asgard On-line Game – 2003 Taiwan
Mingle Sneakers – 2002 Hong Kong
Lenovo computer – 2002 China
Lupiao Shampoo – 2002 China
Chinesegamer On-line Game – 2001 Taiwan
Siemens 2118 – 2001 Taiwan

Concerts
2008 KEN CHU CONCERT 2009 ~Freedom~ March 21–22, 2009 Tokyo, Japan / March 24, 2009 Osaka, Japan
2008 [I-KEN] 2nd Solo Concert March 8–9, 2008 Tokyo, Japan
2007 [I-KEN] 1st Solo Concert February 24–25, 2007 Tokyo, Japan
F4 Forever 4 – March 22–25, 2006 Hong Kong
On Ken's Time Mini Concert – 2005 Hong Kong
F4 Bangkok Fantasy – 2004 Thailand
F4 Happy New Year 2004 – 2003 Philippines
The Event (with Vanness and ASOS) – 2003 Philippines
Fantasy F4ever Live Concert World Tour – 2002~2003 Taiwan, Hong Kong, Malaysia, Indonesia, Singapore, China and the U.S.
F4 Music Party – 2001 Taiwan

Drama/Theater
Played the main lead in the recently concluded mainland comedy stage play, "Love on A Two Street/He and His Two Wives", which played to different cities in China from November 2009 to February 2010.

References

External links
F4ever (Official F4 Fan Club)

1979 births
Living people
Taiwanese expatriates in Singapore
Taiwanese male film actors
Taiwanese male television actors
Taiwanese writers
F4 (band) members
Participants in Chinese reality television series
Taiwanese idols
21st-century Taiwanese singers